Tom Berte (born September 25, 1943) is an American semi-retired professional stock car racing driver. He has competed in the ARCA Menards Series from 2003 to 2020, with a majority of his starts being with Venturini Motorsports. He last competed part time in the No. 12 Toyota for Fast Track Racing.

Racing career
Berte attempted to make his ARCA Re/Max Series debut in 2003, driving for his own team in the No. 40 Chevrolet at Lowe's Motor Speedway, but ultimately failed to qualify. He would attempt to qualify for two races the following year, and Charlotte and at Chicagoland Speedway, failing to qualify for both events.

Berte would eventually make his first start in 2005, driving the No. 10 Pontiac for Fast Track Racing at the Milwaukee Mile, finishing 28th in the event. He would make one more start in the year, driving at Chicagoland, finishing 41st due to electrical issues. He would make three more starts in the following year, earning a best finish of 14th at Pocono Raceway. He also attempted to qualify for the inaugural race at Iowa Speedway driving for Roulo Brothers Racing, but ultimately failing to qualify.

For 2007, Berte would join Venturini Motorsports for a select number of races in the No. 25 Chevrolet, entering seven races, making six and failing to qualify at Kentucky Speedway. He secured a best finish of 13th at the first Pocono race. He would remain with Venturini for 2008, driving for various entries, with a season-best 15th at New Jersey Motorsports Park.

Berte would stay with the team for 2009–2012, mainly driving the No. 35 Chevrolet for six races that year with a best finish of 15th at Millville, New Jersey. For the next year, he would run the No. 15 along with the 35 in select races with a best finish of 14th at Pocono after an engine failure at Palm Beach International Raceway and a crash at Texas Motor Speedway in his first two starts of the year. He would remain in those entries for 2011, upping his best career finish with a 13th at Michigan Speedway. For 2012, he would run four races in the No. 20 and No. 35 in select races with a best finish of 17th in his first start of the year at Michigan.

For 2013–2016, Berte would race with his own team, Tom Berte Racing, driving the No. 20 Chevrolet/Toyota in five races with a best finish of 17th at Road America. In the following year, Berte would run in five races with a best finish of 13th at Chicagoland, but was involved in a crash at the season finale at Kansas Speedway with Dale Shearer and Galen Hassler. This also included a one off in the No. 66 Chevrolet at Pocono with points borrowed from Venturini Motorsports. Berte would plan to race in seven events in 2015, including both Pocono events, Michigan, Iowa, Chicagoland, Kentucky and Kansas, although he would not enter in the Michigan event. In the second Pocono races, Berte would earn his first top-10 at Pocono with a tenth place finish. For the 2016 season, he would seven races with a best finish of 12th at Kentucky. He would race in Kansas, before, in what was originally announced to be his final ARCA race, he retired with an engine issue and finished 31st.

Despite his initial retirement announcement, Berte would return to Venturini Motorsports for two races in 2017, running at Pocono in the No. 20 Toyota, finishing 15th, and at Chicagoland in the No. 55 entry, where he would finish 16th.

Berte would return to Fast Track Racing in 2018 driving the No. 10 for three races with a best result of 19th at Charlotte and Chicagoland, and after a year absence, he would return with the team in 2020 at Phoenix driving the No. 12 Toyota, where he would finish 19th due to a crash. He has not run in the series since then.

Personal life
Berte is the vice-president and chief financial officer of CGS Premier, a fabricating and designing company for mobile health clinics based in Muskego, Wisconsin that has sponsored Berte during the course of his racing career.

Motorsports results

ARCA Menards Series
(key) (Bold – Pole position awarded by qualifying time. Italics – Pole position earned by points standings or practice time. * – Most laps led.)

References

1943 births
Living people
NASCAR drivers
ARCA Menards Series drivers
Racing drivers from Milwaukee
Racing drivers from Wisconsin
People from New Berlin, Wisconsin